San Juan Jabloteh Football Club is a football club located in San Juan, Trinidad and Tobago that plays in the country's TT Pro League. The team plays its home games in Hasely Crawford Stadium in Mucurapo, Trinidad.

History 
The club was founded in 1974, with the stated objective to "uplift the socio-economic and moral condition of the young people of San Juan and its environs." Upon the creation, by the Trinidad and Tobago Football Association, of a Semi-Professional League in 1994, San Juan Jabloteh converted itself from a youth organization into a professional football club. With the backing of CL Financial in 1996, the club significantly expanded its operations. From 1997 to 1999, the team finished fourth in the Semi-Professional League in three consecutive years.

Upon the creation of Trinidad and Tobago's first professional league in 1999, San Juan Jabloteh became one of the league's founding members. Since joining, the club has been the league's most successful club, winning the league championship in 2002, 2003–04, 2007 and 2008. San Juan Jabloteh have also represented the league in the CONCACAF Champions' Cup in 2004.

According to the team's website, "Through its name of the Club identified itself with one of the national birds of the country – the Oil or Devil Bird-which lives in the Aripo Caves.  Originally, the French settlers called the Bird: Les Diables Oiseaux which were translated by the local settlers into Diablotin and finally Jabloteh."

In July 2012, the club chose to withdraw the senior team from the TT Pro League, having already ceased to work on youth football projects and chose to concentrate on their netball team.

Managers 
 Steve Rutter (2004)
 Terry Fenwick (2005–2011)

Honours 
Domestic
TT Pro League: 4
2002, 2003–04, 2007, 2008

FA Trophy: 2
1998, 2005

First Citizens Cup: 2
2000, 2003
Runner-up (1): 2005

Digicel Pro Bowl: 3
2003, 2005, 2006
Runner-up (1): 2001, 2004

TOYOTA Classic: 1
2008
Runner-up (1): 2007, 2009

International
CFU Club Championship: 1
Winner (1): ::2003
Runner-up (1): 2006
Third Place (1): 2009

Year-by-year

International competition 
1998 CFU Club Championship:
Quarter-Finals v.  Aiglon du Lamentin – 0:2

2003 CFU Club Championship
Semi-Finals v.  Arnett Gardens – 3:1, 1:3 (San Juan Jabloteh advances 6:2 on aggregate)
Final v.  W Connection – 2:1, 2:1 (San Juan Jabloteh wins 4:2 on penalties)

2004 CONCACAF Champions' Cup
Quarter-Finals v.  Chicago Fire – 5:2, 0:4 (Chicago Fire advances 6:5 on aggregate)

2004 CFU Club Championship
First Round v.  Walking Boyz Company – 3:1, 0:0 (San Juan Jabloteh advances 3:1 on aggregate)
Semi-Finals v.  Tivoli Gardens – 1:1, 0:1 (Tivoli Gardens F.C. advances 2:1 on aggregate)

2006 CFU Club Championship
Group Stage v.  SAP – 4:0
Group Stage v.  SV Britannia – 8:0
Group Stage v.  New Vibes – 5:0
Semi-Finals v.  Baltimore – 2:0
Final v.  W Connection – 0:1

2007 CFU Club Championship
Group Stage v.  CSD Barber – 5:0
Group Stage v.  SV Deportivo Nacional – 5:1
Quarter-Finals v.  Baltimore – 1:0
Semi-Finals v.  Harbour View – 0:0 (Harbour View advances 10:9 on penalties)
3rd Place v.  Puerto Rico Islanders – 0:1, 0:0 (Puerto Rico Islanders wins 1:0 on aggregate)

2009 CFU Club Championship
Second Round v.  Inter Moengotapoe – 2:1, 3:1 (San Juan Jabloteh advances 5:2 on aggregate)
Semi-Finals v.  W Connection – 1:2
3rd Place v.  Tempête – 2:1

2009–10 CONCACAF Champions League
Preliminary Round v.  San Francisco F.C. – 0:2, 3:0 (San Juan Jabloteh advances 3:2 on aggregate)
Group Stage v.  Deportivo Toluca – 0:1, 0:3
Group Stage v.  D.C. United – 0:1, 1:5
Group Stage v.  Marathón – 1:3, 2:4

2010 CFU Club Championship
Second Round v.  Alpha United – 2:0
Second Round v.  River Plate – 1:0
Final Round v.  Joe Public – 0:1
Final Round v.  Bayamón – 4:1
Final Round v.  Puerto Rico Islanders – 0:1

2010–11 CONCACAF Champions League
Preliminary Round v.  Santos – 0:1, 0:5 (Santos advances 6:0 on aggregate)

References

External links 
Official site
Profile on Soca Warriors Online

 
Association football clubs established in 1974
Football clubs in Trinidad and Tobago
1974 establishments in Trinidad and Tobago